Liang Huiling (born August 1962) is a Chinese politician, currently serving as governor of Heilongjiang and chairwoman of the .

Liang was a delegate to the 11th National People's Congress and is a delegate to the 13th National People's Congress. She was a member of the 19th Central Commission for Discipline Inspection. She was a representative of the 19th National Congress of the Chinese Communist Party. She is a representative of the 20th National Congress of the Chinese Communist Party and a member of the 20th Central Committee of the Chinese Communist Party.

Early life and education
Liang was born in Yicheng County (now Yicheng), Hubei, in August 1962. After resuming the college entrance examination, in 1979, she entered Central China Normal University, where she majored in Chinese language and literature. After university in 1983, she taught at Xiangfan No. 5 Middle School for only five months.

Political career
Liang joined the Chinese Communist Party (CCP) in October 1985. In December 1984, Liang became deputy secretary of Xiangfan Municipal Committee of the Communist Youth League of China, rising to secretary in June 1994. In February 1995, she was appointed deputy party secretary of Gucheng County, and held that office until June 1997.

Beginning in 1997, Liang served in several posts in Xiaogan, including vice mayor (1998–2000), head of the Organization Department of the CCP Xiaogan Municipal Committee (2000–2003), deputy secretary (2003–2008), acting mayor (2006), and mayor (2006–2008).

In July 2008, Liang was made president and party branch secretary of Hubei Women's Federation, replacing .

In August 2011, Liang was appointed party secretary of Ezhou, a post he kept until January 2013, when she was promoted to vice governor of Hubei. Liang was appointed head of the United Front Work Department and president of the Hubei Provincial Federation of Trade Unions in April 2015 and was admitted to member of the Standing Committee of the CCP Hubei Provincial Committee, the province's top authority.

Liang was transferred from her job in Hubei province to north China's Hebei province in December 2016. She was appointed secretary of Hebei Provincial Commission for Discipline Inspection and was admitted to member of the Standing Committee of the CCP Hebei Provincial Committee, the province's top authority. She concurrently served as director of the Hebei Provincial Supervisory Commission since January 2018.

Liang was party branch secretary of the Red Cross Society of China in October 2018, in addition to serving as executive vice president.

References

1962 births
Living people
Central China Normal University alumni
Central Party School of the Chinese Communist Party alumni
Governors of Heilongjiang
People's Republic of China politicians from Hubei
Chinese Communist Party politicians from Hubei
Members of the 20th Central Committee of the Chinese Communist Party
Delegates to the 11th National People's Congress
Delegates to the 13th National People's Congress
21st-century Chinese women politicians